QND may refer to:

 Qatar National Day
 Quantum nondemolition measurement